Maydenia Sarduy González (born 20 April 1984) is an archer from Cuba.

Sarduy represented Cuba at the 2004 Summer Olympics.  She placed 58th in the women's individual ranking round with a 72-arrow score of 595.  In the first round of elimination, she faced 7th-ranked Justyna Mospinek of Poland.  Sarduy lost 162-145 in the 18-arrow match, placing 42nd overall in women's individual archery.

References

1984 births
Living people
Cuban female archers
Olympic archers of Cuba
Archers at the 2004 Summer Olympics
Archers at the 2007 Pan American Games
Archers at the 2011 Pan American Games
Archers at the 2015 Pan American Games
Archers at the 2019 Pan American Games
Pan American Games bronze medalists for Cuba
Pan American Games medalists in archery
Central American and Caribbean Games bronze medalists for Cuba
Central American and Caribbean Games silver medalists for Cuba
Competitors at the 2014 Central American and Caribbean Games
Competitors at the 2018 Central American and Caribbean Games
Central American and Caribbean Games medalists in archery
Medalists at the 2011 Pan American Games
20th-century Cuban women
21st-century Cuban women